Té Bheag is a blended Scotch whisky made by Pràban na Linne Ltd in Scotland. It is one of Sir Iain Noble's Gaelic Whisky range, which has its headquarters at Eilean Iarmain on the Isle of Skye.

See also
 List of whisky brands
 List of distilleries in Scotland

External links
 Pràban na Linne

Isle of Skye
Blended Scotch whisky